Kheng may refer to:
Kheng people, people of Bhutan
Kheng language, the Bodish language of the Kheng people
 Benjamin Kheng (born 1990), Singaporean actor and singer
 Narelle Kheng (born 1993), Singaporean actress and singer